Nats or NATS may refer to:

Politics
 National Party (South Africa) and its supporters
 New Zealand National Party and its supporters
 Scottish National Party and its supporters

Sports 
 Syracuse Nationals, an NBA team currently known as the Philadelphia 76ers
 Washington Nationals, the current baseball team in Washington, DC
 Washington Nationals (disambiguation), any of a number of historical baseball teams
 Nats Park
 Nats Xtra
 Raleigh Nats
 Vancouver Nats, an ice hockey team from British Columbia, Canada

Transport 
 NATS Holdings, the United Kingdom's main Air Navigation Service Provider
 North Atlantic Tracks
 Naval Air Transport Service, a branch of the United States Navy from 1941 to 1948

Other uses 
 Nat (unit), a unit of information
 Nat (spirit), in Burmese religion
 Nat caste, a  social group of India
 NATS Messaging, an open source messaging (message oriented middleware) system
 National Association of Teachers of Singing, a professional organization for singing teachers
 Next-Generation Administration and Tracking System, an affiliate program backend
 Nihon Automobile High Technical School (Japanese Wikipedia)
 Nissan Anti-Theft System
 North Avenue Trade School

See also
 Nat (disambiguation)
 Young Nationals (disambiguation)
 Gnat